Lamoria inostentalis is a species of snout moth in the genus Lamoria. It was described by Francis Walker in 1863. It is found in Malaysia.

References

Moths described in 1863
Tirathabini